Femoral head fractures are very rare fractures of the upper end (femoral head) of the thigh bone (femur). They are a very rare kind of hip fracture that may be the result of a fall like most hip fractures but are more commonly caused by more violent incidents such as traffic accidents They are categorized according to the Pipkin classification based on the following bone fracture patterns:

See also 
Femoral neck

References

Orthobullets

Hip fracture classifications